Lesnica is a large village and municipality in the Stará Ľubovňa District in the Prešov Region of northern Slovakia.

History
In historical records the village was first mentioned in 1297.

Geography
The municipality lies at an altitude of 485 metres.

Villages and municipalities in Stará Ľubovňa District